IIFA Utsavam Award for Best Actor - Telugu is given by the International Indian Film Academy in South Indian segment which is known as IIFA Utsavam  as part of annual ceremony for Telugu Films, to recognise a male actor who has delivered an outstanding performance in a leading role. The recipient is chosen by viewers and the winner is announced at the ceremony.

Winners
Year indicates film release year.

Nominations
2015:Mahesh Babu - Srimanthudu
 Ram Charan - Bruce Lee - The Fighter
 Nani - Bhale Bhale Magadivoy
 NTR Jr - Temper
 Prabhas - Baahubali: The Beginning

References

International Indian Film Academy Awards